Brifacia is a genus of annelid worm in the class Polychaeta.

References 

Sabellida
Polychaete genera